Rhinus is a genus of air-breathing land snails, terrestrial pulmonate gastropod mollusks in the family Simpulopsidae.

Species 
Species within the genus Rhinus include:
 Rhinus angosturensis (Gruner, 1841)
 Rhinus argentinus (Ancey, 1901)
 Rhinus botocudus Simone & Salvador, 2016
 Rhinus ciliatus (Gould, 1846)
 Rhinus constrictus (L. Pfeiffer, 1841)
 Rhinus durus (Spix, 1827)
 Rhinus evelinae Leme, 1986
 Rhinus felipponei (Ihering, 1928)
 Rhinus heterotrichus (Moricand, 1836)
 Rhinus koseritzi (Clessin, 1888)
 Rhinus obeliscus F. Haas, 1936
 Rhinus ovulum (Reeve, 1849)
 Rhinus pubescens (Moricand, 1846)
 Rhinus rochai (F. Baker, 1914)
 Rhinus scobinatus (Wood, 1828)
 Rhinus suturalis (F. Baker, 1914)
 Rhinus taipuensis (F. Baker, 1914)
 Rhinus thomei (Weyrauch, 1967)
 Rhinus velutinohispidus (Moricand, 1836)
Species brought into synonymy
 Rhinus heterogrammus (Moricand, 1836): synonym of Protoglyptus heterogramma (S. Moricand, 1836)
 Rhinus longisetus (Moricand, 1846): synonym of Protoglyptus longiseta (S. Moricand, 1846)

References

 Moricand S. 1846, 1876. Troisième supplément au Mémore sur les coquilles terrestres et fluviatiles de la province de Bahia envoyées par M. Blanchet. Mémoires de la Société de Physique et d’Histoire Naturelle de Genève 11: 147-160
 Bank, R. A. (2017). Classification of the Recent terrestrial Gastropoda of the World. Last update: July 16th, 2017.

External links 
 Albers, J. C.; Martens, E. von. (1860). Die Heliceen nach natürlicher Verwandtschaft systematisch geordnet von Joh. Christ. Albers. Ed. 2. Pp. i-xviii, 1-359. Leipzig: Engelman
 Breure, A. S. H. & Araujo, R. (2017). The Neotropical land snails (Mollusca, Gastropoda) collected by the “Comisión Científica del Pacífico.”. PeerJ. 5, e3065

Simpulopsidae